The 2018 Humboldt State Lumberjacks football team represented Humboldt State University as a member of the Great Northwest Athletic Conference (GNAC) in the 2018 NCAA Division II football season. The Lumberjacks were led by first-year head coach Damaro Wheeler and played their home games at the Redwood Bowl. The finished the season with a record of 2–8 overall and 2–6 in GNAC play to place fourth. This was final season for the Humboldt State football program, as the school has discontinue the sport at the conclusion of the 2018 season.

Schedule

References

Humboldt State
Humboldt State Lumberjacks football seasons
Humboldt State Lumberjacks football